A list of past, present and future United Kingdom amusement parks.

A 
Adventure Island
Alton Towers Resort
Adventure Wonderland

B
The Big Sheep
Billing Aquadrome
Blackgang Chine
Blackpool Pleasure Beach
Botton's Pleasure Beach
Brean Leisure Park

C 
Camel Creek Adventure Park
Chessington World of Adventures
Clarence Pier
Codonas Amusement Park
Coney Beach Pleasure Park
Crealy Great Adventure Parks

D 
Diggerland
Dingles Fairground Heritage Centre
Drayton Manor Theme Park''
Dreamland Margate

F 
Fantasy Island
Flambards Theme Park
Flamingo Land Resort
Funland

G 
 Great Yarmouth Pleasure Beach
 Gulliver's Kingdom
 Gulliver's Land
 Gulliver’s Valley
 Gulliver's World

H 
Harbour Park
Hidden Valley Discovery Park
Hollycombe Steam Collection

J
Joyland

L 
Landmark Forest Adventure Park
Legoland Windsor
Lightwater Valley

M 
M&Ds, Scotland's Theme Park
The Milky Way (amusement park)

O 
Oakwood Theme Park

P 
Paultons Family Theme Park
Pleasurewood Hills (East Anglia)

R 
Robin Hill

S 
Southport Pleasureland

T 
Thorpe Park
Twinlakes Theme Park

W 
West Midland Safari Park
Wheelgate Park
Wicksteed Park
Woodlands Family Theme Park

Previous amusement parks 
The American Adventure
Barry's Amusements
Camelot Theme Park
Frontierland Family Theme Park
Loudoun Castle
Pleasure Island Theme Park

Future amusement parks 
London Resort (currently during consultation stages)

See also 
List of amusement parks
List of amusement parks in Europe
List of water parks in Europe

Amusement parks
Amusement parks in England
 
United Kingdom
Amusement parks